HMS Pigmy was a  10-gun schooner of the Royal Navy. She was launched in February 1810. She served on the North Sea and North American stations before she was sold in 1823.

Career
Pigmy was commissioned in April 1810 under Lieutenant Edward Moore. On 26 July, the cutters Pygmy and  ran on shore and destroyed a French privateer lugger between Gravelines and Dunkirk. Later in 1811 she was converted from a cutter to a schooner.

During 1812, Lieutenant William Hutchinson commanded Pygmy, which served in the Downs. In the following year, she served in the Baltic.

War of 1812: In 1814 Pygmy  came under the command of Lieutenant Richard Crossman and served in North America. She participated in the Battle of Lake Borgne. After the Battle of Lake Borgne,  and Pigmy with two bomb vessels,  went up the Mississippi River to create a diversion. These latter five ships were to take part in the Siege of Fort St. Philip (1815).

Fate
She was reconverted to a cutter in 1817. She was sold at Plymouth on 21 May 1823.

Notes

References

Bibliography 

 
 

Schooners of the Royal Navy
Ships built on the River Medway
1810 ships
War of 1812 ships of the United Kingdom